Oryzias luzonensis is a species of fish in the family Adrianichthyidae. It is endemic to north Luzon in the Philippines, and it is difficult to keep in an aquarium. It is overall grayish with a yellow tinge above.

Environment
Oryzias luzonensis is found in a freshwater environment within a benthopelagic depth range. This species is native to a tropical environment.

Size

Distribution
Oryzias luzonensis lives in the northern part of Luzon, the Philippines.

Biology
Oryzias luzonensis is recorded to be a non-migratory species. It is a non-annual breeder.

References

Oryzias
Freshwater fish of the Philippines
Taxa named by Albert William Herre
Fish described in 1934